Beta-2-microglobulin regulator is a protein in humans that is encoded by the B2MR gene.

References 

Genes on human chromosome 15